Pazar is a town and a district of Tokat Province in the Black Sea region of Turkey. The mayor is Adnan Özmen (MHP).

References

Populated places in Tokat Province
Districts of Tokat Province